Trupanea fenwicki is a species of tephritid or fruit flies in the genus Trupanea of the family Tephritidae.

Distribution
New Zealand.

References

Tephritinae
Insects described in 1931
Taxa named by John Russell Malloch
Diptera of Australasia